Ronald Ludington (September 4, 1934 – May 14, 2020) was an American figure skating coach and pair skater. With Nancy Rouillard Ludington, he was the 1960 Olympic bronze medalist, 1959 World bronze medalist, and a four-time U.S. national champion.

Career
With his then-wife, Nancy Rouillard Ludington, he won the U.S. Championships in pair skating four times, between 1957 and 1960, after having been the junior national champions in 1956. They won bronze medals at the 1959 World Figure Skating Championships and 1960 Winter Olympics. Ludington also won the 1958 U.S. junior (silver) dance championship, partnered with Judy Ann Lamar.

Following his competitive career, Ludington took up coaching in Norwalk, Connecticut. His first pupils included Patricia and Robert Dineen, who were killed along with the rest of the U.S. team in the crash of Sabena Flight 548 on their way to the 1961 World Championships. Ludington was not on the plane because neither he nor the Dineens had the money to fund his travel expenses. It was the only World Championships from 1957 to the end of the century which he did not attend as either a competitor or a coach.

Around 1970, due to limited ice time in Detroit, Ludington moved to Wilmington, Delaware to coach at the Skating Club of Wilmington. In 1987, he became the director of the University of Delaware's Ice Skating Science Development Center. He held that position until 2010.

Ludington coached the following skaters:
 Cozette Cady / Jack Courtney, US national pair bronze medalists 
 Kitty Carruthers / Peter Carruthers, pairs silver medalists at the 1984 Winter Olympics
John Coughlin (1985-2019)
 Carol Fox / Richard Dalley, ice dancers at the 1984 Olympics 
 Gale Fuhrman / Joel Fuhrman, US national pair silver medalists 
 Melissa Militano / Johnny Johns, U.S. national pair champions
 Lea Ann Miller / William Fauver
 Kim Seybold / Wayne Seybold
 Stacey Smith / John Summers, three-time U.S. national champion ice dancers
 Calla Urbanski / Rocky Marval
 (Lisa Spitz / Scott Gregory 1984 Ice dancers Olympics. Three time world competitors.
 (Suzanne Semanick / Scott Gregory 1987, 1988 National Senior Dance Champions, 5th 1987 World Championships, 6th 1988 Olympics.
 Karen Courtland / Todd Reynolds, two-time US National Pair Bronze Medalists, 1993 US Olympic Festival Champions, 14th 1994 Olympics

Ludington was named to the World Figure Skating Hall of Fame in 1999, the Professional Skaters Association Coaches Hall of Fame in 2002, and the Delaware Sports Museum and Hall of Fame in 2000.

Personal life 
In 1957, Ludington married his skating partner, Nancy Rouillard. He later married Mary Batdorf, a skating coach. They had a son, Michael, before divorcing in the mid-1970s. Ludington married this third wife, Karen, who also was a professional skater. The marriage ended in divorce in 2011.   Ludington died on May 14, 2020, at the age of 85.

Results

Pairs
(with Nancy Ludington)

Ice dance
(with Lamar)

References

 Scott Hamilton, Landing It.  .

1934 births
2020 deaths
American male pair skaters
American male ice dancers
American figure skating coaches
Figure skaters at the 1960 Winter Olympics
Olympic bronze medalists for the United States in figure skating
University of Delaware people
Sportspeople from Boston
Olympic medalists in figure skating
World Figure Skating Championships medalists
Medalists at the 1960 Winter Olympics
Figure skaters from Boston
20th-century American people